Sekolah Menengah Kebangsaan Subang Utama (commonly referred to as SMKSU) is a secondary school situated in Subang Jaya, Selangor. It was formerly known as Sekolah Menengah Kebangsaan Subang Jaya 2.

The school began classes on 4 December 1989. It is the second oldest national secondary school in Subang Jaya after SMK Subang Jaya.

History 
The construction of the SMK Subang Utama commenced in 1987 and was completed in October 1989. One of the oldest institutions of secondary learning in Subang Jaya, SMK Subang Utama was built to accommodate the swelling population in the area which caused a lack of classrooms in SMK Subang Jaya. The school welcomed its first class of students on 4 December 1989. Located along the main highway into metropolitan Subang Jaya, the school attracts many students residing within the area, especially from the precincts of SS18 and SS19. The school was then equipped with a cafeteria, an assembly area, a multi-purpose field, and four blocks of classrooms, namely Anggerik (A), Bakawali (B), Cempaka (C), and Dahlia (D). The founding class of SMK Subang Utama shared the newly built campus with students of Sekolah Kebangsaan SS19 (SS19 Primary School) as the latter waited for the construction of their school to be completed. The primary-school students temporarily occupied Block A and B, while the secondary students Block C and D.

A single-story block consisting of four workshops (Bengkel Kemahiran Hidup) and a storeroom was built in 1993 for the Kemahiran Hidup subject (Electrical and Electronic, Pipe and Plumbing, Mechanical, and Technical Drawing). In the same year, five science labs were operational. The science labs include two for the lower secondary cohort, one physics lab, one biology lab and one chemistry lab. Due to shortage of classrooms and an increasing student enrollment throughout the years, these science labs became temporary classrooms for Secondary Four students (Floating Classes). On 30 July 1994, the school was officiated by the then State Secretary of Selangor, Dato’ Haji Yaacob bin A. Hamid. The school's name was also changed (from SMK Subang Jaya 2 to SMK Subang Utama) on that day. In 1998, construction began for the school's first Surau. The old makeshift Surau was closed and the Surau was opened to all Muslims, including the public. In 2000, a temporary single-story block was built to accommodate an even larger student population. This block, named Flora (F), houses four additional classrooms. In 2003, a two-story computer lab was built on what was formerly the site of a volleyball court between Block B and Block D. In the following year, a new volleyball court, along with a basketball court were built next to Block A.

In December 2004, the construction of a multi-purpose hall was started. For the next five years, the hall—named Dewan Sumbangsih (English: Contribution Hall)—would be left incomplete, with only a rooftop and structural frames but no walls. Over the years students and alumni alike raised complaints that the hall was not functional during times of extreme weather. For example, students would get wet when it rained outside. The school administrators, with the help of the Parent-Teacher Association, actively fund-raised toward the completion of the hall. The hall was finally completed in 2009 and renamed Dewan Perdana PIBG in honor of the school's Parent-Teacher Association.

Further, in December 2008, new construction of a brand new three-story block was completed in 2009 and named Exora (E). Block Exora opened its doors to students in the following academic year. This block houses new classrooms, a library, state-of-the-art science labs, and workshops. At about the same time, the Surau was renovated and expanded to accommodate the increasing number of worshipers in the area.

Around November 2019, Dewan Perdana PIBG underwent a minor renovation to fix its broken doors, cracked walls and broken windows. Later in December 2019, Block B had its roof replaced and a classroom in Block D was turned into a Digital Classroom, that is, a classroom equipped with an interactive projector, a computer unit with Internet access, sound system etc. Block F and the Bengkel Kemahiran Hidup block, unused for years, were renovated. All four classrooms of Block F have since been occupied.

School Anthem 

The school anthem was written by Madam Hajah Kamisah binti Saabin and arranged by Mr. Mohd. Azzan bin Mohd. Fadzil.

The Parent-Teacher Association (PTA) 

The Parent-Teacher Association of SMK Subang Utama has contributed vastly to the school, financially and in terms of support.

In 2009, the school hall which was once known as Dewan Sumbangsih has been renamed Dewan Perdana PIBG after the Parent-Teacher Association for their great efforts in upgrading the school facilities, particularly the school hall.

Sport Houses 
There are currently four sport houses. The sport houses are named after American space shuttle missions: Atlantis, Challenger, Columbia, and Discovery. Students represent their sport houses in the school's annual Road Run, Sukantara & Sports Day. Prior to 2013, there were five sport houses in place of the present four. Named after the legendary Malaccan warriors, the five houses were formerly known as Hang Tuah, Hang Kasturi, Hang Lekir, Hang Jebat, and Hang Lekiu. The team colour orange (Hang Lekir) was retired after 2012 and since then, the colour orange is associated with the school's sportswear. This downsize was made to reflect the school's smaller student population.

Awards 
In 1997, SMK Subang Utama was awarded the title Sekolah Harapan Negara Peringkat Selangor (English: School of Hope State (Selangor) Level).

In 1998, SMK Subang Utama won second runner up in the Sekolah Harapan Negara Peringkat Kebangsaan (National Level) contest.

In 1998, SMK Subang Utama was placed third in the Sekolah Sejahtera (English: Prosperous School) competition. The school won a computer unit.

In 1999, SMK Subang Utama was the winner of the Program Bersepadu Sekolah Sihat (English: Integrated Healthy School Program) competition.

In 2000, SMK Subang Utama was the winner of Pertandingan Pusat Sumber Daerah Petaling (English: Petaling District Library Contest) and also the runner up of  Pertandingan Pusat Sumber Negeri Selangor (English: Selangor State Library Contest).

On 24 November 2000, SMK Subang Utama was acknowledged as Cemerlang Akademik Kategori Sekolah Menengah by the Ministry of Education (Malaysia) for the school's strong academic record in the Penilaian Menengah Rendah and Sijil Pelajaran Malaysia examination.

In 2001, SMK Subang Utama represented Selangor in the Zon Bandar (English: City Zone) category of Pertandingan Pusat Sumber Peringkat Kebangsaan.

In 2006, SMK Subang Utama was conferred the title Cemerlang (Excellent) by the Ministry of Education and was nominated as one of the cluster schools in Malaysia. Cluster schools are public schools that are given autonomy in administration and adequate funding from the government to excel in specialized fields (academic, sports and extra-curricular activities) of choice.

Notable alumni 
 Hannah Yeoh, Imcumbent member of parliament for Segambut; former member of the Selangor State Legislative Assembly for Subang Jaya (Class of 1996, Head Prefect 1995/1996)
 Joe Flizzow, Malaysian hip hop singer (Class of 1996)
 Levy Li, Miss Malaysia Universe 2008 (Class of 2004)
 Sharifah Sofia, Malaysian Actress.                               
.

Controversies 
In June 2008, SMKSU came under the spotlight when the school board member decide to take action if the organisers of the school's annual ex-prefects reunion invite the Pakatan Rakyat Assemblyman for Subang Jaya, Hannah Yeoh. Yeoh was a former head-prefect of the school.

References 

Schools in Selangor
Secondary schools in Malaysia